The Bulgaria cricket team toured Serbia from 8 to 9 July 2022 to play a three-match Twenty20 International (T20I) bilateral series against hosts Serbia. Bulgaria won their previous series earlier in June during the 2022 Sofia Twenty20. The series was played at the Lisicji Jarak Cricket Ground in Belgrade. The series provided both teams with preparation for the 2022–23 ICC Men's T20 World Cup Europe Qualifier subregional tournaments.

Squads

T20I series

1st T20I

2nd T20I

3rd T20I

Notes

References

External links
 Series home at ESPN Cricinfo

Associate international cricket competitions in 2022